Programmer's Broadcasting, Inc. (PBI) is a small radio broadcasting company based in Minot, North Dakota. The company's main offices and Minot stations, KWGO-FM and KTZU-FM studios are located at 624 31st Ave SW in Minot, North Dakota. KBTO-FM's studios are west of Bottineau on Highway 5.

Programmers Broadcasting, Inc. Purchased KBTO-FM Bottineau, ND in 2002. In 2005, PBI built two additional radio stations (KWGO and KTZU) in Minot, ND. 

It owns:
 KBTO 101.9 (Country) in Bottineau, North Dakota
 KTZU 94.9 (Classic rock) in Minot, North Dakota
 KWGO 102.9 (Country) in Minot, North Dakota

References

 

Radio broadcasting companies of the United States